Yatzeche or Zegache Zapotec (Santa Inés Yatzeche Zapotec, Southeastern Zimatlán Zapotec) is a Zapotec language spoken in the Santa Ana Zegache and Santa Inés Yatzeche municipalities of Zimatlán District of Oaxaca, Mexico.

It is 75% intelligible with Ocotlán Zapotec. Tilquiapan Zapotec may be a dialect.

References

External links 
OLAC resources in and about the Santa Inés Yatzechi Zapotec language
Zapotec Survey completed in Santa Ana Zegache found in the Archive of the Indigenous Languages of Latin America

Zapotec languages